South Travancore Hindu College, is a general degree college located in Nagercoil, Kanyakumari district, Tamil Nadu. It was established in the year 1952. The college is affiliated with Manonmaniam Sundaranar University. This college offers different courses in arts, commerce and science.

Departments

Science
Physics
Chemistry
Mathematics
Botany
Zoology
Computer Application
Electronics

Arts and Commerce
Tamil
Malayalam
English
Sociology
Economics
History and tourism 
Commerce
Business Administration

Accreditation
The college is  recognized by the University Grants Commission (UGC).

References

Educational institutions established in 1952
1952 establishments in Madras State
Colleges affiliated to Manonmaniam Sundaranar University
Universities and colleges in Kanyakumari district
Academic institutions formerly affiliated with the University of Madras
Hindu universities and colleges